1977 U.S. Open may refer to:
1977 U.S. Open (golf), a major golf tournament
1977 US Open (tennis), a Grand Slam tennis tournament